Common names: eastern sand viper.

Vipera ammodytes meridionalis is a venomous viper subspecies endemic to Greece and Turkish Thrace.

Description
According to Boulenger (1913): "Naso-rostral shield never reaching the canthus rostralis and but rarely extending higher up than the upper border of the rostral, which is often as deep as broad, or a little deeper than broad; rostral appendage clad with fourteen to twenty scales, in four or five (rarely three) transverse series between the rostral shield and the apex. Supraciliary edge usually more prominent than in the typical form, sometimes slightly angular. Dorsal scales in 21 rows (very rarely 23). Ventral shields 133 to 147; subcaudals 24 to 35. A more or less distinct blotch on the lower lip, involving five or six labial shields without interruption. Lower surface of end of tail yellow."

Geographic range
It is found in Greece (including Corfu and other islands) and Turkish Thrace

References

Further reading
Boulenger GA. 1903. On the Geographical Variations of the Sand-Viper, Vipera ammodytes. Proc. Zool. Soc. London 1903 (1): 185-186, 2 Figures. (Vipera ammodytes var. meridionalis)

External links
 

ammodytes meridionalis
Reptiles described in 1903